Fort Lyon National Cemetery is a United States National Cemetery located near the city of Las Animas in Bent County, Colorado. It encompasses 51.9 acres (21.0 hectares) and as of 2014 had 2,556 interments. It is administered by the Fort Logan National Cemetery in Denver County, Colorado.

History 
Named for the first Union General to die in the Civil War, Nathaniel Lyon, the cemetery was established as part of Fort Lyon the first time in 1887. The fort was abandoned in 1897 and the remains buried in the cemetery were transferred to Fort McPherson National Cemetery in Nebraska. In 1906 the fort buildings were converted into a sanitarium to treat soldiers and prisoners of war with tuberculosis, and burials began in 1907. The cemetery was transferred to the National Cemetery system in 1973 to be managed by the United States Department of Veterans Affairs.  It was listed on the National Register of Historic Places in 2017.

See also 
 List of cemeteries in Colorado

External links 
 National Cemetery Administration
 Fort Lyon National Cemetery
 
 
 

Cemeteries in Colorado
Protected areas of Bent County, Colorado
United States national cemeteries
Historic American Landscapes Survey in Colorado
National Register of Historic Places in Bent County, Colorado
Cemeteries on the National Register of Historic Places in Colorado
1887 establishments in Colorado
1897 disestablishments in the United States
1907 establishments in Colorado